is a German word for cash.

 Blixa Bargeld, born: Hans Christian Emmerich (born 1959), a composer, author, actor, singer, musician, performer and lecturer

Baargeld 
 Johannes Theodor Baargeld, "Zentrodada", exactly: Alfred Ferdinand Gruenwald (*1892 - 1927, Mont Blanc), German artist

de:Bargeld